Thibaut d'Anthonay is a French writer. He won the Goncourt Prize for biography for his life of Jean Lorrain. He has also written historical novels, such as Le baron de Beausoleil.

References

French male writers
Living people
Year of birth missing (living people)
Place of birth missing (living people)
French biographers